Öreryd is a village and parish in Småland, Sweden, in the county of Jönköping. During World War II, Öreryd hosted a refugee camp and transit center for refugees fleeing Nazi persecution in occupied Norway, from March 1941 until June 1942, when it was replaced by the camp Kjesäter. From 1944 Öreryd was one of the approved training sites for the Norwegian police troops in Sweden.

References

Footnotes

Bibliography

Further reading

Populated places in Jönköping County
Refugee camps in Europe
Småland
Norway in World War II
Refugees in Sweden